Rain Raadik (born 17 May 1989) is an Estonian professional basketball player who plays for Valentino Basket Castellaneta of the Serie C Italian Basketball League. He is a 2.08 m (6 ft 10 in) tall power forward and center. He also represented the Estonian national basketball team internationally.

Estonian national team
Raadik was a member of the junior Estonian national team that finished 12th in the 2007 FIBA Europe Under-18 Championship. He averaged 5.1 points and 4.3 rebounds per game.

Awards and accomplishments

Professional career
Kalev
 Estonian League champion: 2009

University of Tartu
 2× Estonian Cup champion: 2010, 2011

References

External links
 Rain Raadik at basket.ee 
 Rain Raadik at fiba.com

1989 births
Living people
Sportspeople from Pärnu
Estonian men's basketball players
Power forwards (basketball)
Centers (basketball)
Korvpalli Meistriliiga players
KK Pärnu players
BC Kalev/Cramo players
BC Rakvere Tarvas players
University of Tartu basketball team players
TTÜ KK players
BC Valga players